Diver detection sonar (DDS) systems are sonar and acoustic location systems employed underwater for the detection of divers and submerged swimmer delivery vehicles (SDVs).  The purpose of this type of sonar system is to provide detection, tracking and classification information on underwater threats that could endanger property and lives. Further, this information is useful only to the extent that it is made available to authorities in time to make possible the desired response to the threat, be it deterrent or defensive action. Subsurface threats are a difficult problem, because reliable detection is available to date chiefly by use of high-resolution active sonar or trained dolphins or sea lions.
The threat of an underwater terrorist attack is a concern to the maritime industry and port law enforcement agencies.  Ports face a range of threats from swimmers, boat-delivered ordnance such as limpet mines and other forms of improvised underwater explosive devices.
DDS systems have been developed to provide underwater security for ports, coastal facilities, offshore installations, pipelines and ships. Due to the variety of life and objects that exist under the water, it is desirable that a DDS system be capable of distinguishing between large sea mammals, shoals of fish; a ship's wake; a diver with an open circuit scuba set and a stealth diver with a rebreather.
DDS systems have been developed that can be mounted on the seabed, on a pier or on the hull of a vessel. For complete port security these systems are integrated with the surface surveillance and security systems employed at ports, coastal facilities and offshore installations. Various systems provide specialized features to facilitate their use in port security systems including automatic detection features.

Evaluation of DDS systems
In 2006, in a NATO report given by R. T. Kessel and R. D. Hollet at the NATO Undersea Research Center, it was stated that sonar gives by far the lowest cost per square meter of underwater coverage of all other means of surveillance (radar, video, visual). This is because sound waves have a low attenuation and long propagation distance in turbid harbor waters relative to other means of sensing (electromagnetic waves, visual light, temperature, magnetism). The leading sonar technology for detecting and tracking underwater intruders is active, monostatic sonar, using principles of conventional beam forming in its signal processing. These sonars are now available from a number of different manufacturers who recommend their use for surveillance against underwater intruders, whereas, other sonar technologies, such as active multi-static or passive sonar, possibly with model-based signal processing, remain at best in the development stage so far as intruder detection is concerned.

Mature diver detection sonar technology
In the above-mentioned study, conducted with the Italian Navy, it was found that diver or intruder detection sonar technology is mature inasmuch as:
 It has demonstrated 360 degree coverage with detection ranges of 300 to 800 m against intruders wearing open-circuit breathing equipment. The coverage is significant relative to the area of open water and to the possible entry points for intruders in many harbours.
 Reduced detection range and track fragmentation, when it occurred, could be accounted for by environmental (sound propagation) conditions at the time (see below).
 Random false alarms are rare (when the auto-detection is properly adjusted), and they are recognizably false because they are of short duration and do not follow a track.
 Non-random false alarms caused by genuine underwater contacts that happened not to be intruders—by large fish, or schools of fish, or marine mammals, for instance—can usually be recognized by an experienced operator from the contact's behaviour, especially the evolution of their track, so these false alarms are unlikely to be troublesome in practice. They furthermore provide feedback about the functioning of the sonar and domain awareness.
 The automatic algorithms are capable of detecting and tracking many contacts simultaneously. Were the diver detection sonar systems to rely strictly on the echograph generated by the sonar units overlaid on a navigation chart, then a diver or SDV would appear as a relatively small moving shape that is refreshed with each transmission or ping of the sonar against a fluctuating background of sound clutter and reverberation. The operator would have to recognize the shape and judge if it represents a threat calling for further action or not. This is problematic in that they would have to be highly trained sonar operators. For this reason, commercial DDS systems use automation to simplify the sonar display by suppressing the echograph and displaying only the chart and detection and tracking information.

Commercial use
In 2008, the Port of Gdańsk purchased the first DDS system to be installed in a commercial oil terminal.

In December, 2008, DDS system sold to an undisclosed EMEA government. The system was installed in an area with critical infrastructure, including a port and energy production facilities.

March 4, 2009, a $1.7M order for an underwater security system was placed, to be used by a large energy facility at an undisclosed location in Asia, to guard and protect the customer infrastructure from underwater intrusion and sabotage.

March 12, 2009, sale of multiple DDS sensors, which protect a strategic site against underwater intrusion.

May 25, 2009, US Navy orders additional sonar systems.

December 2011, Asian customer places the world's largest order for underwater security systems protection of oil platforms.

March 2012, undisclosed navy places repeat order for multiple DDS systems.

May 2012, multiple sales of diver/intruder detection sonars for undisclosed middle eastern facilities.

August 2012, ministry of defense of one of the world's largest armies orders a portable diver detection sonar.

November 9, 2012, a large defense integrator places an order for six portable diver detection sonar for vessel protection.

June 2016, armed forces of Kazakhstan order several diver detection sonar for the second time.

January 8, 2018, Indian Navy ordered 78 PointShield portable diver detection sonar units.

See also 
 Anti-frogman techniques
 Cerberus Swimmer Detection System
 DDS-03 :es:SAES
 Swimmer detection sonar AN/WQX-2
 NORBIT Intruder detection sonars (GUARDPOINT)

References

External links
 DDS-03 – Intruder Detection Sonar 
 Sociedad Anónima de Electrónica Submarina (SAES) 
 AquaShield Diver Detection Sonar System
 DSIT Solutions Ltd.
 Diver Detection Systems www.naval-technology.com 
 
  Diver Detection Sonar's and the Protection of Underwater Pipelines 31 January 2008